Provincial Route 6 is a 177 km interurban road (numbered from km 30 to km 210), located on the outer edge of Greater Buenos Aires, in the metropolitan part of the province of Buenos Aires and extends from Provincial Route 215 in the town of Ángel Etcheverry (Greater La Plata) to the city of Zárate.

History 
This ring road was built in the decades of 1960 and 1970 to ease access to the country's capital (Buenos Aires) of passing heavy traffic. The first paved section of this route, with a length of 38.7 km between the cities of Campana and Luján, was built by the contractor company Marengo, which completed the works in 1967. The same year, the works to open a trace with a dirt road were completed in two sections: one of 73.2 km between Luján and Cañuelas built by Santos Giovannini and another of 33.3 km between Cañuelas and San Vicente by Prates y Cía. On April 26, 1972, the Marengo construction company completed the paving work on the section between San Vicente and the Partido de La Plata.

Over time, industrial poles were installed in the vicinity of this highway, which contributed to the large increase in truck traffic on this route. In 1999 the government of Buenos Aires Province allocated funds to build a highway along the route, but shortly after the change of government the idea was scrapped.

At the beginning of the decade of 2000, the national State ceded to the province of Buenos Aires the section of National Route 12 from its beginning at the junction with National Route 9 in Campana (km 76) until the access roundabout to Zárate (km 84). This section was added to Provincial Route 6. By Provincial Law 13,281 published in the Official Gazette on January 7, 2005, this section was named "Dr. Federico Jorge Hotton".

On May 18, 2003, the construction of the 187 km highway with a concrete road began, divided into eight sections, the first of which is an extension of the route to Berisso. The work was inaugurated in sections from north to south, starting from the city of Campana.

At the beginning of 2010, a dual carriageway from Zárate to the junction with the Acceso Oeste in the Luján Partido, was inaugurated. The section between Acceso Oeste and Cañuelas was under repair, with only one hand to travel. In May 2015, the double-track works were completed on the entire route, and the formation of a company in charge of maintaining the route through toll collection was announced.

In 2012, the then-governor of Buenos Aires, Daniel Scioli, revoked the concession to the private company after several demands from the provincial government towards the company to advance in a delayed third lane. Under the orbit of the Secretary of Public Services, the company advanced with the third lane, the two traditional lanes were repaved, lighting fixtures were replaced and a monitoring center with 180 cameras was created.

Finally, with the change of government, the province decided that the state-owned company AUBASA would be in charge of the maintenance, and conservation of Ruta 6, which would be also a toll road.

Major intersections

References

Provincial roads in Buenos Aires Province